Donald Reche Caldwell Jr. (  or  ; March 28, 1979 – June 6, 2020) was an American professional football player who was a wide receiver in the National Football League (NFL) for six seasons in the 2000s with the San Diego Chargers, New England Patriots and Washington Redskins. Caldwell played college football for the Florida Gators.

Early years 

Caldwell was born in Tampa, Florida, in 1979.  He attended Jefferson High School in Tampa, where he was a three-sport standout in high school football, basketball and baseball for the Jefferson Dragons.  In football, Caldwell started at tailback as a freshman; as a sophomore, he converted to quarterback—a position he had never played—and threw for 6,936 yards and 77 touchdowns as a three-year starter.  As a junior in 1996, he threw for 2,338 yards, led the Dragons to the Class 5A state semifinal game, earned high school All-American honors from PrepStar, and was named the Florida Class 5A Player of the Year.  He was a first-team all-state selection in 1996 and a second-team selection in 1997.

In four high school baseball seasons, he set the Jefferson Dragons' career records for batting average (.379), doubles (25), triples (six), steals (67) and runs (76).  The Cincinnati Reds selected him in the 1998 MLB draft, but he decided to play college football instead.

College career 

Caldwell accepted an athletic scholarship to attend the University of Florida in Gainesville, where he was a three-year letterman for coach Steve Spurrier's Gators teams from 1998 to 2001.  As a junior in 2001, he was a third-team All-American selection by The National Sports Bureau, an honorable mention All-American selection by the Football News, a semi-finalist for the Fred Biletnikoff Award (annually given to nation's top receiver), and a second-team All-Southeastern Conference selection.  He finished his impressive junior season with sixty-five receptions for 1,059 yards (an average of 16.3 yards per catch) and ten touchdowns, becoming only the ninth receiver in Gators history to gain over 1,000 yards receiving in a single season.  Caldwell majored in leisure service management.

Professional career

San Diego Chargers 

Caldwell was selected by the San Diego Chargers in the second round of the 2002 NFL Draft with the 48th overall pick. In his rookie season, he had twenty-two catches for 208 yards and three touchdowns and returned nine kickoffs for a 24.4-yard average. In 2003, he played in nine games with four starts for the Chargers; he caught eight passes for eighty yards and rushed for thirty-nine yards on five carries.

His  season began with three touchdown receptions in the Chargers' first five games.  However, in a game against the Atlanta Falcons in Week 6, Caldwell suffered a knee injury, tearing his anterior cruciate ligament (ACL), and was lost for the season.  He returned to play a full season in 2005.

New England Patriots 

Caldwell subsequently signed with the New England Patriots prior to the  season.  He went on to total over 60 catches and 700 yards on the season.  During a playoff game against the Chargers, Caldwell had seven receptions for 80 yards, including a four-yard touchdown reception from quarterback Tom Brady in the fourth quarter.  A week later in the AFC Championship game, he dropped two passes during the Patriots' 38–34 loss to the Indianapolis Colts.  Caldwell was released by the Patriots four days before the first game of the 2007 season.

Washington Redskins 

Caldwell signed a one-year contract with the Washington Redskins in September 2007.  During the  season, he appeared in eight games for the Redskins with fifteen receptions for 141 yards.

St. Louis Rams 

On March 25, 2008, Caldwell signed a one-year contract with the St. Louis Rams.  However, he was released during the final preseason roster cuts.

In his six-season NFL career, Caldwell appeared in seventy-one games, starting in twenty-nine of them, while making 152 receptions for 1,851 yards and eleven touchdowns.  He also tallied fourteen carries for 108 yards rushing.

Personal life 

Caldwell was the older brother of Andre Caldwell, former Florida Gators wide receiver and NFL wide receiver and kick returner.

On May 14, 2014, Caldwell was arrested for drug possession and intent to distribute. On January 30, 2015, he was sentenced to 27 months in federal prison and three years probation for possession of MDMA with intent to distribute. In addition, he pleaded guilty to drug charges involving marijuana and ecstasy, along with charges involving gambling.

On December 12, 2019, Caldwell was accused by the Justice Department of conspiracy to commit health care fraud. He pleaded guilty to one charge of conspiracy to commit health fraud on January 23, 2020, and was set to be sentenced in June 2020.

Death 
Caldwell was shot and killed on June 6, 2020. According to his mother, the shooting occurred during an attempted robbery. Police reported that the killing did not appear to be random, and that the apparent robbery may have been planned.

See also 

 List of Florida Gators in the NFL Draft
 List of New England Patriots players
 List of Washington Redskins players

References 

1979 births
2020 deaths
American football wide receivers
Florida Gators baseball players
Florida Gators football players
New England Patriots players
San Diego Chargers players
St. Louis Rams players
Washington Redskins players
American murder victims
Thomas Jefferson High School (Tampa, Florida) alumni
Players of American football from Tampa, Florida
Baseball players from Tampa, Florida
Deaths by firearm in Florida
Prisoners and detainees of the United States federal government
African-American players of American football
20th-century African-American sportspeople
21st-century African-American sportspeople